Andrew Hardie was second-in-command of the Radical Forces who marched on Scotland's Carron Ironworks at Bonnymuir near Falkirk in the "Radical War" of 1820.

He was sentenced to death and was executed outside Stirling Tolbooth on 8 September 1820, along with John Baird. In his speech on the scaffold he declared himself "a martyr to the cause of truth and justice".

References

1820 deaths
1820 crimes in the United Kingdom
Executed revolutionaries
Scottish people executed for treason against the United Kingdom
British Militia soldiers
People from East Dunbartonshire
Year of birth missing
Executed Scottish people
People executed by the United Kingdom by hanging